BPM (stylized in all lowercase) is the third studio album by Portuguese singer Salvador Sobral. The album was released on 28 May 2021 by Warner Music Spain. It was produced by Venezuelan musician and producer Leo Aldrey.

Singles
"Sangue do meu sangue" was released as the lead single from the album on 24 March 2021. The second single was the English-language song "Paint The Town" and was released on 26 May 2021, two days before the release of the album.

Reception 
BPM was nominated for Best Engineered Album at the 22nd Annual Latin Grammy Awards.

Track listing

Personnel 
Credits are adapted from the album's inner notes.

Musicians

 Salvador Sobral – vocals 
 Abe Rábade – piano, Rhodes piano, Hammond organ
 André Santos – guitar, rajão
 André Rosinha – double bass
 Bruno Pedroso – drums
 Leo Aldrey – keys, soundscapes, upright piano on "Mar de memórias" and "Só eu sei"

Production

 Leo Aldrey – production, mixing
 Nelson Carvalho – recording
 Moritz Kerschbaumer – recording (Cacri Studio and Estúdio 15a)
 Rafael Giner – mixing
 Tiago de Sousa – mastering
 Caroline Deruas – photography
 Juan Daniel González – design

Charts
Album chart usages for Spain
Album chart usages for Portugal

References

2021 albums
Salvador Sobral albums